Myklebost is the name of the following places:

Myklebost, Sandøy, a village in Sandøy municipality, Møre og Romsdal, Norway
Myklebost, Vanylven, a village in Vanylven municipality, Møre og Romsdal, Norway
Myklebost, Ålesund, a village in Ålesund municipality, Møre og Romsdal, Norway

See also
Myklebust (disambiguation)
Myklebostad (disambiguation)